"To the Inhabitants of America" is an open letter written by former Continental Army Major General Benedict Arnold not long after his defection to the British side in the American Revolutionary War. The letter, dated October 7, 1780, was published in New York on October 11. In it, he explains his justification for his actions.

Background 

Benedict Arnold entered the American Revolution as a patriot fighting for American independence. Arnold had many successful campaigns, and was considered by many to be the best general and most accomplished leader in the Continental Army. In September 1777 he led a division of the army commanded by Horatio Gates against British General John Burgoyne at the Battle of Freeman's Farm. Following that battle, disagreements between Arnold and Gates boiled over, for reasons including Gates' failure to credit Arnold for his role in the battle, and Gates removed Arnold from command. In the Battle of Bemis Heights in early October, Arnold, against Gates' orders, took to the battlefield, where he played a key role in rallying the troops to attack the British position. In 1778 the American rebels formed an alliance with France, which Arnold was very much opposed to (as demonstrated by the letter). Arnold also made enemies everywhere he went, including politically well-connected military officers and members of the Continental Congress. Charges and countercharges between Arnold and his enemies led to multiple courts martial and investigations of Arnold's financial management of his various commands. These actions, and the influence of his second wife, Peggy Shippen, the daughter of a wealthy Philadelphia Loyalist, led Arnold to begin negotiations to change sides with British Major John André in 1779.

In July 1780, Arnold sought and obtained command of the fort at West Point. Arnold offered to hand the fort over to the British for £20,300 and a Brigadier's commission. Arnold's plot was exposed in September 1780 when Major André was captured by American troops while carrying incriminating documents. Arnold fled to New York City when he learned of André's capture; on October 2, 1780 at Tappan, New York, the thirty-year-old André was hanged as a British spy.

The letter 
To explain and justify his actions, Arnold wrote an open letter dated October 7, 1780 that was published on October 11 in New York by the Royal Gazette. This letter to "The Inhabitants of America" outlined what Arnold saw as the corruption, lies, and tyranny of the Second Continental Congress and the Patriot leadership.

Arnold said in the letter that he supported the War of Independence to get a redress of grievances. But he argued that once Great Britain granted the redress, there was no reason to continue the war. Arnold believed this had been achieved when the British Government offered terms for peace. So he encouraged Americans to reject the Declaration of Independence and return to the British Empire.

Arnold also objected to the Americans' alliance with France. He thought France was too weak to establish America's independence. He depicted Catholic France as "the enemy of the Protestant faith" and accused France of speaking of liberty while holding its people in bondage.

In his argument, Arnold made a plea to the "common sense" of this action. His choice of words alluded to Thomas Paine's pamphlet, Common Sense, which had been circulating in America since 1776.

Arnold was living in British-controlled New York when his letter was published and he had been given a commission as a British officer. The letter "To the Inhabitants of America" was the first in a series of letters directed at different groups in America. He followed it with "A Proclamation to the Officers and Soldiers of the Continental Army" dated October 20, 1780. These letters essentially echoed common Loyalist opinion.

American reactions 
Many New England newspapers published responses to Arnold's letter. The Connecticut Courant published a response by Noah Webster that answered Arnold with "patriotic ardor." The normally even-tempered Washington's reaction to Arnold's treason was very bitter; he saw Arnold as villainous, misguided, and completely evil.

References

External links
 

 

1780 in the United States
1780 works
Benedict Arnold
Documents of the American Revolution
Open letters